Slender West Lake is a scenic lake and AAAAA Tourist Attraction and national park in Yangzhou City, Jiangsu Province, China. Specifically, it is located in Hanjiang District of Yangzhou, just northwest of the city's historic center.

The lake is long and slender, giving it its name.

Description
A long bank planted with weeping willows spans the lake; at its midpoint stands a square terrace with pavilions at each of the corners and one in the center. Around the lake is a park in which are found several attractions: Lotus Flower Pagoda (Lianhua SO, a white structure reminiscent of the White Pagoda (Baita) in Beijing's Beihai Park; Small Gold Mountain (Xiao Jin Shan); and the Fishing Platform (Diaoyutai), a favorite retreat of the Qianlong Emperor. The emperor was so gratified by his luck in fishing at this spot that he ordered additional stipends for the town. As it turns out, his success had been augmented by local swimmers who lurked in the lake busily attaching fish to his hook.

Adjacent waterways
The Slender West Lake's southern end is near the northwestern corner of Yangzhou's historic city center (the former walled city). From this point, the Erdaohe Canal runs south, along the western edge of the former walled city to the Hehuachi ("Lotus Pond") at the old city's southwest corner; the Hehuachi is in its turn connected by the short Erdiaohe Canal with the Old Grand Canal of China.

Another canal, Huchenghe ("the City Moat") runs east from the Slender West Lake's southern end; at its eastern end, it also connect to the Old Grand Canal. A parallel canal farther to the north, the Caohe, connects the Slender West Lake with the Old Grand Canal as well.

See also
 List of Chinese gardens

References 

National parks of China
Yangzhou
Lakes of Jiangsu
Tourist attractions in Jiangsu
AAAAA-rated tourist attractions